is a JR East railway station on the Hanawa Line in the city of Hachimantai, Iwate Prefecture, Japan.

Lines

Station layout
Yokoma Station consists of a single ground-level side platform serving a single bi-directional track. There is no station building, but only a small shelter on the platform. The station is unattended.

History
Yokoma Station opened on November 1, 1966, serving the town of Ashiro. The station was absorbed into the JR East network upon the privatization of JNR on April 1, 1987.

Surrounding area
The station is located in a rural area, surrounded by fields. There are no buildings nearby.

See also
 List of Railway Stations in Japan

References

External links

  

Hanawa Line
Railway stations in Japan opened in 1966
Railway stations in Iwate Prefecture
Stations of East Japan Railway Company
Hachimantai, Iwate